Before the introduction of Buddhism in Bhutan, the prevalent religion was Bon. Some scholars assert that it was imported from Tibet and India, perhaps in the eighth century when Padmasambhava introduced his lineages of Vajrayana Buddhism into Tibet and the Himalayas. Some scholars hold that Bön doctrine became so strongly reinvigorated in Bhutan by Buddhism that by the eleventh century it reasserted itself as an independent school. Bön continues to be practiced in modern Bhutan.

Scofield (1976:  p. 669), one of the first western journalists into Bhutan, outlined that:
The dough offering is what is known as a torma.  The sacred syllable a, the first letter and sound of the Sanskrit and Tibetan languages, is a bīja mantra about which volumes have been written in Hinduism, Bon and Vajrayana. Ravens are sacred in many traditions and for many peoples.

Sources
 
Scofield, John (1976). Life Slowly Changes In A Remote Himalayan Kingdom. In National Geographic, November 1976.

References

Bon
Religion in Bhutan